Vera Mukhanova (born 24 September 1937) is a Soviet middle-distance runner. She competed in the women's 800 metres at the 1964 Summer Olympics.

References

1937 births
Living people
Athletes (track and field) at the 1964 Summer Olympics
Soviet female middle-distance runners
Olympic athletes of the Soviet Union
Place of birth missing (living people)